Anti Liiv (born 16 March 1946 in Kuressaare) is an Estonian psychiatrist, psychologist and politician. He was a member of VIII Riigikogu.

References

Living people
1946 births
Estonian psychologists
Estonian psychiatrists
Estonian educators
Estonian Centre Party politicians
Members of the Riigikogu, 1995–1999
University of Tartu alumni
Academic staff of Tallinn University
People from Kuressaare
Members of the Riigikogu, 1999–2003